Chah-e Mobarak Rural District is in Chah-e Mobarak District of Asaluyeh County, Bushehr province, Iran. At the censuses of 2006 and 2011, its constituent parts were in Asaluyeh District of Kangan County. The rural district's establishment was officially announced on 12 December 2012. At the most recent census of 2016, the population of the rural district was 12,078 in 2,974 households. The largest of its 15 villages was Chah-e Mobarak, with 4,968 people.

References 

Rural Districts of Bushehr Province
Populated places in Asaluyeh County